The Westinghouse J34, company designation Westinghouse 24C, was a turbojet engine developed by Westinghouse Aviation Gas Turbine Division in the late 1940s. Essentially an enlarged version of the earlier Westinghouse J30, the J34 produced 3,000 pounds of thrust, twice as much as the J30. Later models produced as much as 4,900 lb with the addition of an afterburner. It first flew in 1947. The J46 engine was developed as a larger, more powerful version of Westinghouse's J34 engine, about 50% larger.

Development

Built in an era of rapidly advancing gas turbine engine technology, the J34 was largely obsolete before it saw service, and often served as an interim engine. For instance, the Douglas X-3 Stiletto was equipped with two J34 engines when the intended Westinghouse J46 engine proved to be unsuitable. The Stiletto was developed to investigate the design of an aircraft at sustained supersonic speeds. However, equipped with the J34 instead of its intended engines, it was seriously underpowered and could not exceed Mach 1 in level flight.

Developed during the transition from piston-engined aircraft to jets, the J34 was sometimes fitted to aircraft as a supplement to other powerplants, as with the Lockheed P-2 Neptune and Douglas D-558-2 Skyrocket (fitted with radial piston engines and a rocket engine, respectively).

The afterburner was developed by Solar Aircraft, the first U.S. company to produce a practical afterburner.

Variants
J34-WE-2  thrust
XJ34-WE-4  thrust; originally designated J45
XJ34-WE-7  thrust
J34-WE-11 Similar to -42 with short afterburner
J34-WE-13  thrust
J34-WE-15 Similar to -42  thrust, with short afterburner
J34-WE-15  thrust
J34-WE-17 Similar to -42  thrust (  thrust with long afterburner)
J34-WE-19  thrust
J34-WE-22 (24C-4B)  thrust
J34-WE-30 (24C-4C)  thrust (  thrust with afterburner)
J34-WE-30A 3,150 lbf (14.01 kN) thrust (4,200 lbf (18.68 kN) thrust with afterburner)
J43-WE-32 Similar to -42  thrust (  thrust with long afterburner)
J34-WE-34 (24C-4D)  thrust
J34-WE-34A  thrust
J34-WE-36 (24C-4E)  thrust
J34-WE-36A   thrust
J34-WE-38  thrust
J34-WE-40  thrust
J34-WE-42   thrust (  thrust with afterburner)
J34-WE-46  thrust
J34-WE-48 Single stage turbine. Contract awarded 1959
W-340Commercial version of the WE-36
24C-4B company designation for WE-22.
24C-4C company designation for WE-30.
24C-4D company designation for WE-34.
24C-8 company designation for WE-32.

Applications

Aircraft
 Convair F2Y Sea Dart
 Curtiss-Wright XF-87 Blackhawk
 Douglas D-558-2 Skyrocket
 Douglas F3D Skyknight
 Douglas X-3 Stiletto
 Fairchild C-119 Flying Boxcar (civilian variant modification)
Grumman OV-1A - Pittsburgh Institute of Aeronautics
 Lockheed P-2E/G/H Neptune
 Lockheed XF-90
 McDonnell 119/220 (prototype only)
 McDonnell F2H Banshee
 McDonnell XF-85 Goblin
 McDonnell XF-88 Voodoo
 North American T-2A Buckeye
 Ryan XFR-4 Fireball
 Vought F6U Pirate
 Vought F7U Cutlass

Others
 Shockwave jet truck
 Snowzilla snow remover
 Spirit of Australia jet boat

Engines on display
A Westinghouse J34 is on public display at the Aerospace Museum of California.

Specifications (J34-WE-36)

See also

References

Notes

Bibliography

 Gunston, Bill. World Encyclopedia of Aero Engines, 5th Edition. Phoenix Mill, Gloucestershire, England, UK: Sutton Publishing Limited, 2006. pp. 240–241. .
 Kay, Anthony L.  Turbojet History and Development 1930-1960 Volume 2: USSR, USA, Japan, France, Canada, Sweden, Switzerland, Italy and Hungary (1st ed.). Ramsbury, UK: The Crowood Press, 2007. .
 Leyes, Richard A., II and William A. Fleming. The History of North American Small Gas Turbine Aircraft Engines (Library of Flight). Reston, Virginia: American Institute of Aeronautics and Astronautics, Inc, 1999. . 
 Roux, Élodie. Turbofan and Turbojet Engines: Database Handbook. Raleigh, North Carolina: Éditions Élodie Roux, 2007. .

External links

 http://www.arkairmuseum.org/engines/engine-westinghouse.php
 http://www.globalsecurity.org/military/systems/aircraft/systems/j34.htm

1940s turbojet engines
J34